Wilchingen-Hallau railway station is a railway station in the municipality of Wilchingen, in the Swiss canton of Schaffhausen. It is located on the standard gauge High Rhine Railway run by Deutsche Bahn.

Services

Train services
 the following services stop at Wilchingen-Hallau:

Bus services
Local bus routes offer services to passengers travelling between the station and Hallau, Osterfingen as well as Oberhallau.

References

External links

Railway stations in the canton of Schaffhausen